Mỹ Đức may refer to several places in Vietnam, including:

Mỹ Đức District, a rural district of Hanoi
Mỹ Đức, Kiên Giang, a ward of Hà Tiên
Mỹ Đức, Haiphong, a commune of An Lão District, Haiphong
Mỹ Đức, An Giang, a commune of Châu Phú District
Mỹ Đức, Lâm Đồng, a commune of Đạ Tẻh District
Mỹ Đức, Bình Định, a commune of Phù Mỹ District

See also
Mỹ Đức Đông, a commune in Cái Bè District, Tiền Giang Province
Mỹ Đức Tây, a commune in Cái Bè District, Tiền Giang Province